Alite is a name for tricalcium silicate, Ca3SiO5.

Alite may also refer to:

Alite Island, an island of the Solomon Islands

People with the surname
John Alite (born 1962), American mobster